American actor Sterling K. Brown has won 12 awards from 24 nominations.

In 2016, Brown earned his first Primetime Emmy Award for Outstanding Supporting Actor in a Limited Series or Movie for his breakout portrayal of attorney Christopher Darden in The People v. O. J. Simpson: American Crime Story. Brown's portrayal of Darden also garnered him the Critics' Choice Television Award, along with Golden Globe Award, Screen Actors Guild Award, and NAACP Image Award nominations.

Brown won his second Primetime Emmy Award for Outstanding Lead Actor in a Drama Series for his portrayal of Randall Pearson in NBC's This Is Us becoming the first actor in a broadcast television series to win the award in a decade and the first African-American winner in 19 years. In 2018, Brown became the first African-American actor to win the Golden Globe Award for Best Actor in a Television Series Drama, for This Is Us. That same year, Brown also became the first African-American actor to win the Screen Actors Guild Award for Outstanding Performance by a Male Actor in a Drama Series, also for This Is Us. He also was part of that year's Screen Actors Guild Award win for Outstanding Performance by an Ensemble in a Drama Series, again for This Is Us. His role on that show also won him the NAACP Image Award for Outstanding Actor in a Drama Series in 2017, and earned him a Teen Choice Award and a TCA Award nomination (both in 2017).

Major associations

Emmy Awards

Golden Globe Awards

Screen Actors Guild Awards

Miscellaneous awards

American Black Film Festival

BET Awards

Black Reel Awards

Critics' Choice Television Awards

Dorian Awards

Hollywood Critics Association Awards

NAACP Image Awards

OFTA Television Awards

People's Choice Awards

Teen Choice Awards

Television Critics Association Awards

References

Brown, Sterling K.